Matthew David Baldwin (born 26 February 1986) is an English professional golfer who plays on the European Tour.

Career
Baldwin was captain of the England Boys side before turning professional in 2008. In 2009 he played on the third-tier Alps Tour and finished 23rd on the Order of Merit, with six top-ten finishes. He made several appearances on the second-tier Challenge Tour in 2010, and performed well enough to finish 82nd on the final standings and gain full status for 2011. In October 2011, he won for the first time on the Challenge Tour at the Fred Olsen Challenge de España. This sealed his promotion to the main European Tour for 2012. He played well enough in his first full season to retain his playing rights, finishing 72nd on the Order of Merit.

In March 2023, Baldwin won on the European Tour for the first time at the SDC Championship in South Africa, an event co-sanctioned by the Sunshine Tour. He won by seven shots ahead of Adri Arnaus.

Personal life
Baldwin is from Southport, Lancashire; the same home town as fellow professional golfer Tommy Fleetwood. His grandfather is the former professional rugby league footballer Ron Ryder.

Amateur wins
2002 McGregor Trophy
2004 European Boys Individual Championship

Professional wins (3)

European Tour wins (1)

1Co-sanctioned by the Sunshine Tour

Challenge Tour wins (1)

Challenge Tour playoff record (1–1)

MENA Tour wins (1)

Results in major championships

 

CUT = missed the half-way cut
"T" = tied

Team appearances
Amateur
European Boys' Team Championship (representing England): 2004 (winners)
Jacques Léglise Trophy (representing Great Britain & Ireland): 2004 (winners)

See also
2011 Challenge Tour graduates
2017 European Tour Qualifying School graduates
2022 Challenge Tour graduates

References

External links

English male golfers
European Tour golfers
Sportspeople from Southport
1986 births
Living people